Niantic (YTB–781) was a United States Navy  named for Niantic, Connecticut.

Construction

The contract for Niantic was awarded 31 January 1964. She was laid down on 10 December 1964 at Marinette, Wisconsin, by Marinette Marine and launched 7 September 1965.

Operational history

Placed in service in the 14th Naval District in June 1966, Niantic was assigned to the 14th Naval District, headquartered at Pearl Harbor, Hawaii.

Stricken from the Navy List 26 April 2006, Niantic was sold by Defense Reutilization and Marketing Service (DRMS) for reuse or conversion, 11 February 2008.

References

External links
 

Natick-class large harbor tugs
Ships built by Marinette Marine
1965 ships